Noam Behr (born 13 October 1975) is an Israeli professional tennis player who turned pro in 1994.

His career-high singles ranking was No. 127 (October 2001), and his career-high doubles ranking was No. 109 (October 1999).

Tennis career

Most of Behr's success was on the Challenger and Futures level, but he often participated in qualifying tournaments of major ATP events.

In 1992, he reached the finals of the US Open boys' singles, losing 7–5, 6–2 to Brian Dunn of the United States. He and Yshai Oliel, who reached the boys' singles final at the 2017 Australian Open, are the only two Israelis to have reached the finals in a boys' Grand Slam event.

In October 1995, he upset world No. 97 Jeff Tarango in Tel Aviv, 6–4, 3–6, 7–5.  In October 1998 he and Eyal Ran won in Uzbekistan.  In December 1998 and February and April 1999, he and Ran won in Mumbai, Calcutta, and New Delhi, India.  In October, he and Ran won in Tel Aviv, and he and Andrei Stoliarov won in Uzbekistan.

In July 2000, he and partner Eyal Erlich won in Istanbul, Turkey.  In October 2000 in Germany, he defeated world No. 66 Martin Damm, 3–6, 6–1, 6–4.  That same month he and partner Aisam-ul-Haq Qureshi of Pakistan won in Nevers, France.  In July 2001 in Toronto, he beat world No. 53 David Prinosil, 6–1, 7–6(2).  In September in Shanghai, he beat world No. 80 Andrew Ilie 7–5, 6–4.  In January 2001, he and Andy Ram won in Aventura, Florida.  In March, he and Noam Okun won in Kyoto, Japan, and in Hamilton, New Zealand.

In April 2002, he and Ota Fukárek won the doubles in Leon, Mexico.  In July 2002, he and partner Michael Joyce won a tournament in Quebec, Canada. He was eliminated in qualifiers at the 2002 U.S. Open.

Behr is now the coach of Ram and Erhlich.

Davis Cup
Behr was 6–7 in Davis Cup play for Israel from 1995 to 2001.

Junior Grand Slam finals

Singles: 1 (1 runner-up)

ATP career finals

Doubles: 1 (1 runner-up)

ATP Challenger and ITF Futures finals

Singles: 10 (3–7)

Doubles: 38 (16–22)

Performance timeline

Singles

See also
List of select Jewish tennis players

References

External links 
 
 
 
 Jewish Virtual Library bio
 Jews in Sports bio

1975 births
Living people
People from Tel Aviv
Israeli Jews
Israeli male tennis players
Jewish tennis players